Elsa Einarsson (born 27 July 1941) is a Swedish speed skater. She competed in four events at the 1960 Winter Olympics.

References

External links
 

1941 births
Living people
Swedish female speed skaters
Olympic speed skaters of Sweden
Speed skaters at the 1960 Winter Olympics
People from Strömsund Municipality
Sportspeople from Jämtland County